Banco del Mutuo Soccorso (English: Bank of Mutual Relief)  is an Italian rock band. A popular progressive rock band in the 1970s, they continued making music in the 1980s and 1990s. Recently, they were still active, playing live in 2001 and 2008 at NEARfest. Their charismatic frontman, Francesco Di Giacomo, died in 2014.

History
Inspired by progressive rock acts from England, in particular Gentle Giant, Jethro Tull and Emerson, Lake & Palmer, keyboardists Vittorio Nocenzi and his brother Gianni founded Banco del Mutuo Soccorso in Rome, Italy. In 1972, together with other musicians from Rome progressive scene, they recorded their eponymous debut album which, with songs such as R.I.P. (Requiescant in pace), Il giardino del mago and Metamorfosi, immediately attracted the attention of the public of the nascent progressive rock scene in Italy. The graphic design of the cover is also very particular: shaped as a terracotta piggy bank. In the same year, the second album was released, Darwin!, the first concept album made by the group: the songs are all linked to the central theme of Charles Darwin's theory on the evolution of species.
In 1973 Io sono nato libero increased their notoriety thanks to the single "Non mi rompete", an acoustic ballad with poetic dreamy lyrics. 
The most prominent features of their sound are the complex textures provided by the piano, Hammond organ and synthesizers played by the Nocenzi brothers, along with the vocals of former frontman Francesco Di Giacomo. A careful balance of electronic and acoustic instruments, with the use of reeds (played by some of the members of the band, in addition to their usual instrument), made Banco's sound increasingly original and innovative, with a blend of rock, jazz and classical music which did not, however, forsake the Italian melodic tradition.

Proving popular in Italy and becoming known abroad, the band  signed with Manticore Records together with the Premiata Forneria Marconi. In 1975 Banco was released, a collection of translated songs together with new material, targeting the international market. Come in un'ultima cena was also translated as As in a Last Supper. The late 1970s saw Banco del Mutuo Soccorso going in new directions, with a film soundtrack in 1976's Garofano rosso and recordings with an orchestra in 1978's ...di terra. They changed their name to the simplified Banco.

The 1980s saw Banco's musical direction change towards lighter pop and shorter songs, producing some hits. This is due to the limited success they had abroad with their albums with English lyrics (also due to the shutdown of Manticore in 1977), which led to the decision to exploit Di Giacomo's remarkable vocal gifts with more marketable songs. Gianni Nocenzi left the band for a solo career. Other members came and went.

In the 1990s and now back to using the longer name, they started playing their 1970s material again. They performed unplugged versions of their songs live and re-recorded their first albums. New material was also produced.

Today, the band continues to play live.

On 21 February 2014, Francesco di Giacomo died in a car accident, in Zagarolo, at the age of 67.

On 3 October 2015, the band guitarist Rodolfo Maltese died too after a long battle with cancer.

In September 2016 some Italian newspapers claimed that the band has taken on Tony D'Alessio, best known from the Italian edition of X-Factor, as the new lead singer.

On 13 January 2019, a press release announced that a new album called "Transiberiana" will be released in April. It will be their first new release after "Nudo", which was published on 1997.

On July 20, 2022 the band's official Facebook page announces the release of the single "Cadere o Volare" for July 22, which anticipates the release of the album Orlando: Le Forme dell'Amore, Concept album on the chivalrous poem Orlando furioso by Ludovico Ariosto, for 23 September. On September 6 "La Pianura Rossa" is released, the second single that anticipates the release of the album.

Members

Current members
 Vittorio Nocenzi – keyboards, vocals (1968-present)
 Filippo Marcheggiani – guitar (1994-present)
 Nicola Di Già – guitar (2013-present)
 Tony D'Alessio – vocals (2016-present)
 Marco Capozi – bass (2016-present)
 Dario Esposito – drums (2023-present)

Former members

 Mario Achilli – drums (1968-1969)
 Claudio Falco – guitar (1969-1971)
 Fabrizio Falco – bass (1968-1971)
 Franco Pontecorvi – drums (1969-1971)
 Marcello Todaro – guitar (1971-1973)
 Renato D'Angelo – bass (1971-1978)
 Karl Potter – percussions (1979-1980)
 Gianni Colajacomo – bass (1978-1984)
 Gianni Nocenzi – keyboards (1968-1984)
 Gabriel Amato – bass, keyboards (1985)
 Paolo Carta – guitar (1986-1987)
 Pierluigi Calderoni – drums (1971-1992)
 Francesco Di Giacomo – vocals (1971-2014)
 Maurizio Masi – drums (1992-2015)
 Alessandro Papotto – flute (1999-2015)
 Rodolfo Maltese – guitar, flute (1973-2015)
 Arnaldo Vacca – percussions (2014-2015)
 John De Leo – vocals (2015-2016)
 Tiziano Ricci – bass (1987-2016)
 Vito Sardo – drums (2015-2016)
 Maurizio Solieri – guitar (2015-2016)
 Augusto Zanonzini – drums (2016-2017)
 Fabio Moresco – drums (2017-2023)

Timeline

Discography

Studio albums

Live albums

Other releases

Singles 
1973 - Non mi rompete/La città sottile (Dischi Ricordi, SRL 10713)
1979 - Canto di primavera/Circobanda (Dischi Ricordi, SRL 10896)
1979 - Niente/Sono la bestia (Dischi Ricordi, SRL 10908)
1980 - Il ragno/Capolinea (Dischi Ricordi, SRL 10915)
1980 - Paolo Pà / Ma che idea
1980 - Dove sarà / Ma che idea
1980 - Il ragno / Rip
1981 - Baciami Alfredo / Buone notizie
1981 - Tommy/Mississippi (pubblicato come La banda di Tom)
1983 - Moby Dick / Velocità
1983 - Lontano da
1985 - Grande Joe / Allons enfant
1989 - Padre Francesco/Vedo il telefono/La mia libertà (Contempo, PT 42926 EP)
1994 - Brivido
1997 - Nudo
1997 - Ragno
2019 - I ruderi del gulag
2022 - Cadere o volare
2022 - La pinura rossa

Videos
 Ciò che si vede è (1992, DVD release in 2004)
 Live 1980 (2007)

See also 
Balletto di Bronzo
I Cervello
La Locanda delle Fate
Le Orme
Osanna
Nova
Premiata Forneria Marconi
Il Rovescio della Medaglia

References

Italian progressive rock groups
Italian rock music groups
Musical groups established in 1969
Symphonic rock groups
Musical groups from Rome